Irene Greif is an American computer scientist and a founder of the field of computer-supported cooperative work (CSCW). She was the first woman to earn a Ph.D. in computer science from the Massachusetts Institute of Technology.

Biography
Greif's mother was an accountant, and a native of New York City. Greif has at least one sibling, a sister. She attended Hunter College High School before earning her undergraduate and graduate degrees from MIT. In 1975, Greif became the first woman to earn a Ph.D. in computer science from MIT; in her dissertation of that year, she published the first operational actor model.

She was a professor of computer science at the University of Washington before returning to MIT as a professor of electrical engineering and computer science (1977–87). In 1984, Greif and Paul Cashman coined the term "Computer Supported Cooperative Work" and the initials, CSCW, at an interdisciplinary workshop in Cambridge, Massachusetts. Preferring research over teaching, she left academia in 1987 to join Lotus, where she directed its Product Design Group, and created the Lotus Research group in 1992. After Lotus was acquired by IBM, she became an IBM Fellow and served as director of collaborative user experience in the company's Thomas J. Watson Research Center. Greif is a Fellow of the American Academy of Arts and Sciences (AAAS) and the Association for Computing Machinery (ACM); she is also a member of the National Academy of Engineering. Her awards include Women in Technology International Hall of Fame inductee (2000), Women Entrepreneurs in Science and Technology Leadership Award (2008), and ABIE Award for Technical Leadership from the Anita Borg Institute (2012).

Greif is featured in the Notable Women in Computing cards.

Now living in Newton Centre, Massachusetts, Greif retired from IBM in 2013. She is married to Albert R. Meyer, the Hitachi America Professor of Computer Science at MIT. Greif, who is Jewish, has a son and daughter, as well as two step-children.

Selected works
 1975, Semantics of communicating parallel processes
 1980, Programs for distributed computing : the calendar application
 1982, Cooperative office work, teleconferencing and calendar management : a collection of papers
 1983, Software for the 'roles' people play
 1988, Computer-supported cooperative work : a book of readings

References

External links

 

Year of birth missing (living people)
Scientists from New York City
American women computer scientists
American computer scientists
American Jews
IBM Fellows
Hunter College High School alumni
MIT School of Engineering alumni
MIT School of Engineering faculty
University of Washington faculty
Members of the United States National Academy of Engineering
Human–computer interaction researchers
Living people
Fellows of the Association for Computing Machinery
Fellows of the American Academy of Arts and Sciences
American women academics
21st-century American women
Academics
Women
Women in computing
IBM employees
IBM people
IBM Women